Polina Vladimirovna Agureeva (born September 9, 1976) is a Russian stage actress, singer of songs, laureate of the State Prize of the Russian Federation.

Winner of national awards Seagull Award (2000), State Prize (2001), Kinotavr (2004), Golden Mask (2009) and  Golden Eagle Award (2013).

Career
The actor's style of Agureeva, according to critics, is characterized by the gift to penetrate into other epochs, the ability to create in a variety of roles, outstanding vocal, plastic, lyricism and exciting eroticism. The tragic and dramatic roles prevailing in the work of the actress assert the uniqueness of love as the highest value in the world, permeated with symbols of mercy, compassion and eternal femininity.

In 2003–2007 was married to director Ivan Vyrypaev. She has a son Pyotr (born in 2005).

Filmography
 2004 Long Farewell as Lyalya Telepnyova
 2006 Euphoria as Vera
 2007 Liquidation (miniseries) as Tonya Tsarko
 2009 Isayev (TV series) as Anna 
 2010 Who Wasn't There as Katya
 2012 Life and Fate (miniseries) as Yevgenia Shaposhnikova
 2014 Kuprin. Pit (miniseries) as Tamara 
 2014 Goodbye, My Love! (TV Series) as Margarita Sotnikova
 2014 Sex, Coffee, Cigarettes as She 
 2016 Collector as Tamara (voice)
 2019 Van Goghs as Masha

References

External links
 
 Полина Агуреева на сайте «Мастерская Петра Фоменко»

1976 births
Living people
Actors from Volgograd
State Prize of the Russian Federation laureates
Russian film actresses
Russian television actresses
Russian stage actresses
20th-century Russian actresses
21st-century Russian actresses
Russian Academy of Theatre Arts alumni
Academicians of the National Academy of Motion Picture Arts and Sciences of Russia
Musicians from Volgograd